Elmer T. Shannon (2 February 1892 in Stevens Point, Wisconsin – 14 February 1961 in Los Angeles, California) was an American racecar driver. The 1919 Indianapolis 500 was his only AAA Championship Car race start, though he entered a race at the Sheepshead Bay Race Track later that year but the car did not arrive. He was primarily a mechanic, engineer, and car builder.

Indy 500 results

References

1892 births
1961 deaths
Indianapolis 500 drivers
People from Stevens Point, Wisconsin
Racing drivers from Wisconsin